The Olkiluoto Nuclear Power Plant is one of Finland's two nuclear power plants, the other being the two-unit VVER Loviisa Nuclear Power Plant. The plant is owned and operated by Teollisuuden Voima Oyj (TVO), a subsidiary of Pohjolan Voima, and is located on Olkiluoto Island, on the shore of the Gulf of Bothnia, in the municipality of Eurajoki in western Finland, about 20 kilometres from the town of Rauma and about 50 kilometres from the city of Pori.

The Olkiluoto plant consists of two boiling water reactors (BWRs), each producing 890 MW of electricity, together comprising 22% of the country's electricity generation for 2020. A third reactor, Unit 3, reached first criticality in late 2021, and at a nameplate capacity of 1,600 MW net electric output, will by itself satisfy 14% of the country's electricity demand.

Unit 3 is an EPR reactor and has been under construction since 2005. The start of commercial operation was originally planned for May 2009 but was postponed repeatedly. The reactor eventually started up on 21 December 2021, and electricity production started on 12 March 2022. In May 2022, foreign material was found in the turbine steam reheater, and the plant was shut down for about three months of repair work. On 30 September 2022, the reactor reached its maximum output power for the first time. In October damage was detected in all of the feed water pumps and unit 3 was shut down for an investigation. Commercial operation is scheduled for March 2023 after test production.

Units 1 and 2 

Units 1 and 2 consists of two BWRs, each producing 890 MW of electricity. The main contractor was ASEA-Atom, now a part of Westinghouse Electric Sweden AB. Turbine generators were supplied by Stal-Laval. The units' architecture was designed by ASEA-Atom. The reactor pressure vessels were constructed by Uddcomb Sweden AB, and reactor internal parts, mechanical components by Finnatom. The electrical equipment was supplied by Strömberg. Unit 1 was constructed by Atomirakennus and unit 2 by Jukola and Työyhtymä. Unit 1 achieved its initial criticality in July 1978 and it started commercial operations in October 1979. Unit 2 achieved its initial criticality in October 1979 and it started commercial operations in July 1982.

The original power of the reactors was 660 MW. They were uprated to 710 MW in 1983–1984, to 840 MW in 1995–1998, and further to 860 MW in 2005–2006. Major upgrades were carried out to the units in 2010 and 2011, including replacement of turbines and generators, isolation valves, electrical switchgear and seawater pumps. The upgrades increased the net electrical output by 20 MW to 880 MW each.

In 2017, unit 2 was upgraded and modernized, increasing the output further to 890 MW from the beginning of 2018. A similar upgrade to unit 1 was performed in 2018. The extended maintenance was also made to prepare for a license renewal application. The license extension was granted in September 2018 and allows the reactors to operate until 2038.

A decision-in-principle for a fourth reactor to be built at the site was granted by the Finnish parliament in July 2010, but, in June 2015, TVO decided that it would not apply for a construction license for Olkiluoto 4.

Unit 3 

In February 2005, the Finnish government gave its permission to TVO to construct a new nuclear reactor, making Finland the first Western European country in 15 years to order one. The construction of the unit began in 2005. The start of commercial operation was planned for 2010, but has been pushed back several times.

Olkiluoto 3 is the first EPR, which is a type of third generation PWR, to have gone into construction. It will have a nameplate capacity of 1600 MW. Japan Steel Works and Mitsubishi Heavy Industries manufactured the unit's 526-ton reactor pressure vessel.

At the start of construction, the main contractor was Areva NP (now Framatome, after the sell-off mentioned below), a joint venture of Areva and Siemens. However, in 2009, Siemens sold its one-third share of Areva NP to Areva, which is now the main contractor. Siemens remained on the project as the subcontractor with the main responsibility for constructing the turbine hall. Areva sold its majority stake in Framatome (previously Areva NP), its nuclear reactor and fuel business, to Électricité de France.

According to TVO, the construction phase of the project would create a total of about 30,000 person-years of employment directly and indirectly; that the highest number of on-site employees has been almost 4,400; and that the operation phase would create 150 to 200 permanent jobs. A 90 MW battery storage is scheduled for 2022.

On 8 December 2021 the company submitted its application to Finland's Radiation and Nuclear Safety Authority asking permission to start up Unit 3 and to move forward with initial testing of the unit. This was granted on 16 December 2021. First criticality of the OL3 EPR plant unit was reached on 21 December 2021. An unplanned automatic trip occurred on 14 January 2022, delaying connection to the national grid to February 2022. The electricity production of Olkiluoto’s third nuclear power plant unit started on Saturday, 12 March 2022, at 12.01 p.m. In May 2022, foreign material detached from the steam guide plates was found in the turbine steam reheater, and the plant was shut down for about three months of repair work. The test production phase should complete in December 2022, when regular electricity production should start.

In September 2022, the Radiation and Nuclear Safety Authority (STUK) granted a licence for the Olkiluoto 3 reactor to increase its power output to more than 60 percent to a full 4,300 MW of thermal capacity. On 30 September 2022, the reactor achieved its design output power. In October 2022, damage was discovered in the feedwater pumps, delaying the end of commissioning testing. On 28 October, it was announced cracks a few centimetres long had been found in all four of the feedwater pump impellers. The feedwater pumps are larger than in other nuclear reactors. In January 2023, it was announced that new more robust impellers will be installed in all four feedwater pumps, and test operation at full power should restart in February.

Construction delays 
The first license application for the third unit was made in December 2000 and the date of the unit's entry into service was estimated to be 2010. However, since the start of construction, several delays to the schedule have been announced. In July 2012 TVO announced that the unit would not go into service before 2015, five years after the original estimate. In a statement, the operator said it was "not pleased with the situation" although solutions to various problems were being found and work was "progressing", and that it was waiting for a new launch date from Areva and Siemens. At the end of 2013, TVO said that the Areva-Siemens consortium plans to reduce workers and subcontractors on the construction site and says that it expects the contractor to provide details about the expected impact on the project's schedule. In February 2014, TVO said that it could not give an estimate of the plant's startup date because it was still waiting for the Areva-Siemens consortium to provide it with an updated overall schedule for the project." Later the same month it was reported that Areva was shutting down construction due to the dispute over compensations and unfinished automation planning. According to Kauppalehti, the estimated opening was delayed until 2018–2020. In July 2019 TVO announced that regular electricity generation is expected to start in July 2020. The delay was caused by slower than expected modification works. In August 2020 TVO announced that regular electricity generation is delayed to February 2022 due to slow progress in system testing, technical problems found in the testing, and delivery time of spare parts to replace faulty components.

The delays have been due to various problems with planning, supervision, and workmanship, and have been the subject of an inquiry by STUK, the Finnish nuclear safety regulator. The first problems that surfaced were irregularities in the foundation concrete, and caused a delay of months. Later, it was found that subcontractors had provided heavy forgings that were not up to project standards and which had to be re-cast. An apparent problem constructing the reactor's unique double-containment structure also caused delays, as the welders had not been given proper instructions.

In 2009, Petteri Tiippana, the director of STUK's nuclear power plant division, told the BBC that it was difficult to deliver nuclear power plant projects on schedule because builders were not used to working to the exacting standards required on nuclear construction sites, since so few new reactors had been built in recent years.

In 2010, Jukka Laaksonen, Director General of STUK at that time, analyzed reasons for the delay:
 Many nuclear power plants were constructed in Europe in the 1970s and 1980s. After that there was a long break in the construction, and experienced experts retired.
 Areva did not have experience in construction of nuclear power plants. In all the earlier projects in which Areva supplied the reactor, Électricité de France was responsible for the construction management. Many experienced subcontractors had left the business, and Areva had to find new subcontractors and to coach them in nuclear manufacturing.
 The original schedule, four years from construction start to grid connection, was too ambitious for a first-of-a-kind plant that is larger than any earlier reactor.
 The project started very slowly because Areva was not adequately prepared. When the construction permit was given in 2005, parts of the detailed design were not yet available. Areva did not recognize how much additional work was needed to complete it. The construction started to proceed in a controlled manner two years later.
 Areva was not used to STUK’s regulatory approach with an early focus on the quality of structures and components. Manufacturing information and a quality control plan must be approved by both the licensee and STUK before manufacturing of the most important components is allowed to start. Inspections with hold points are made during the manufacturing.
 The large size of the reactor and the application of new technologies brought major challenges. Some manufacturing technologies had not been used before. For instance, new welding techniques were used in the reactor pressure vessel. Many large components, such as pressurizer forgings and some reactor internal parts, had to be re-manufactured once or twice to achieve the specified quality.
 TVO’s key persons did not have experience from management of a large construction project.

Construction of the turbine succeeded better under the responsibility of Siemens. Installations of the main turbine equipment were completed about one year behind the original schedule.

After the construction of the unit started in 2005, Areva began constructing EPRs in Flamanville, France, and in Taishan, China. However, as of 2019, the construction of the EPR in France is ten years behind schedule. Taishan 1 in China became the first EPR to start power generation on 29 June 2018, and the second one (Taishan 2) came online in 2019.

Cost 

The main contractor, Areva, is building the unit for a fixed price of €3 billion, so in principle, any construction costs above that price fall on Areva. In July 2012, those overruns were estimated at more than €2 billion, and in December 2012, Areva estimated that the full cost of building the reactor would be about €8.5 billion, well over the previous estimate of €6.4 billion. Because of the delays, TVO and Areva both sought compensation from each other through the International Court of Arbitration.

In October 2013, TVO's demand for compensation from Areva had risen to €1.8 billion, and Areva's from TVO to €2.6 billion. In December 2013, Areva increased its demand to €2.7 billion. On 10 March 2018 French newspaper Le Monde announced that Areva and TVO had reached an agreement. A day later, TVO confirmed that Areva would pay it €450 million in compensation over the delays and lost income. The agreement would settle all legal actions between the two companies. With the settlement, TVO disclosed its total investment to be around €5.5 billion. Areva had accumulated losses of €5.5 billion. The total cost of the project, therefore, is estimated to be €11 billion.

Between 2013 and 2017 OL1 and OL2 produced between 13,385 GWh and 14,740 GWh per year at capacity factors between 87.2% and 96%. OL3 is expected to produce an additional 12,000-13,000 GWh annually. Even taking into account all OL3 construction delays the long term LCOE target for all three plants is 30 EUR/MWh. LCOE for the OL3 reactor alone is estimated at 42 EUR/MWh.

Criticism 

In 2009, Stephen Thomas wrote, "Olkiluoto has become an example of all that can go wrong in economic terms with new reactors," and that Areva and the TVO "are in bitter dispute over who will bear the cost overruns and there is a real risk now that the utility will default." The project has also been criticized by STUK because "instructions have not been observed in the welding of pipes and the supervision of welding." STUK has also noted that there have been delays in submitting proper paperwork.

Olkiluoto 3 was supposed to be the first reactor of 3+ generation which would pave the way for a new wave of identical reactors across Europe, safe, affordable, and delivered on time. The delays and cost overruns have had knock-on effects in other countries.

The construction workforce includes about 3,800 employees from 500 companies. 80% of the workers are foreigners, mostly from eastern European countries. In 2012 it was reported that one Bulgarian contracting firm is owned by the mafia, and that Bulgarian workers have been required to pay weekly protection fees to the mafia, wages have been unpaid, employees have been told not to join a union and that employers also reneged on social security payments.

Unit 4 

On 14 February 2008, TVO submitted an environmental impact assessment of unit four to the Ministry of Employment and Economy. On 21 April 2010, the government of Finland decided to grant a decision-in-principle to Teollisuuden Voima for the fourth reactor in Olkiluoto. The decision was approved by the parliament on 1 July 2010. If constructed, the fourth unit would be a PWR or a BWR with a power output of 1,000 to 1,800 MW.

In September 2014, with unit 3 still unfinished, the Finnish government rejected TVO's request for time extension of the unit 4 decision-in-principle. Economic Affairs Minister Jan Vapaavuori referred to the long delay of the 3rd reactor and to unsatisfactory assurances by TVO that the 4th unit would ever be built. Nevertheless PM Stubb stated that the rejection didn't spell the end for the OL4 project, and that TVO would have the opportunity to apply for a construction license before the decision-in-principle expires in June 2015.

In June 2015 TVO decided not to apply for a construction permit for the Olkiluoto 4 unit because of delays with the unit 3, however saying they are prepared to file for a new decision-in-principle later.

Onkalo spent nuclear fuel repository 

The Onkalo spent nuclear fuel repository is a deep geological repository for the final disposal of spent nuclear fuel, the first such repository in the world. It is currently under construction at the Olkiluoto plant by the company Posiva, owned by the nuclear power plant operators Fortum and TVO.

Agriculture 

The waste heat, an output common to all thermal power plants, which heats the cooling water (at 13 °C) is utilized for small-scale agriculture before being pumped back to the sea. The power plant hosts the northernmost vineyard in the world, a 0.1 ha experimental plot that yields 850 kg Zilga grapes annually. Another use is a pond for growing crabs, whitefish and sturgeon for caviar.

Incidents 
An incident occurred at unit 2 on 10 December 2020 at 12:22. Because of a valve repair work, excessively hot water flowed to the reactor water clean-up system filters. The hot water dissolved materials from the filters. When the clean-up system was restarted, the dissolved materials flowed to the reactor core, where they became radioactive. This caused the radiation levels in the steam line to rise momentary 3–4 times higher than the normal level. The increase of the radiation level activated safety systems, which operated as planned and triggered reactor scram, closed containment isolation valves, and started the containment spray system. The operators followed procedures and declared a site area emergency at 12:32. The event caused a full-scale emergency response at the power plant and at the Radiation and Nuclear Safety Authority. There was no radioactive release to the environment, and the workers were not exposed to radiation. The event was categorized as 0 on the INES scale, which means that it was an exceptional event with no safety significance. The reactor was restarted on 19 December, nine days after the incident.

In April 2014 a turbine steam condenser of unit 1 had a small seawater leak, at a rate of two litres per hour. According to the operator, the leak forced to limit the plant output down to 300 MW, but was not serious and was to be repaired in a day.

Timeline of the Olkiluoto 3 project

See also 

 List of nuclear reactors#Finland
 Hanhikivi Nuclear Power Plant
 Nuclear engineering
 Nuclear power in Finland
 Onkalo spent nuclear fuel repository
 Into Eternity, a 2010 documentary about the construction of a Finnish waste depository
 Journey to the Safest Place on Earth, a 2013 documentary about the urgent need for safe depositories

Notes and references

External links 

 Radiation and Nuclear Safety Authority in Finland
 European Pressurised Reactor at Olkiluoto 3, Finland – Brief Interim Review of the Porosity and Durability Properties of the In Situ Cast Concrete at the Olkiluoto EPR Construction Reactor at Olkiluoto 3, Finland – Review of the Finnish Radiation Nuclear Safety Authority (STUK) Assessment'', R3123-A2, July 2005
 Reactor at Olkiluoto 3, Finland – Review of the Finnish Radiation Nuclear Safety Authority (STUK) Assessment, R3123-A2, July 2005
 Status of Nuclear Power in Finland.

Nuclear power stations in Finland
Radioactive waste repositories
Nuclear power stations using boiling water reactors
Nuclear power stations using pressurized water reactors
Nuclear power stations with reactors under construction
Nuclear power stations with proposed reactors
Nuclear power stations using EPR reactors
Eurajoki
Buildings and structures in Satakunta